The Masurian Canal is an unfinished 50.4 km long canal connecting the Łyna River in Kaliningrad Oblast of Russia (a tributary of the Pregolya) and Lake Mamry, one of the Masurian Lakes in Poland.  

The Polish-Russian border cuts through the canal, with the southern section, about 20 km long, located in Poland, and the remainder in Russia.

The canal's purpose was to spur the economic development of Masuria. Construction began in 1911 but was interrupted by World War I, was resumed in the 1920s  – since Russian trade ceased after the October Revolution – and again in the 1930s.  The project was finally terminated by World War II, with no attempt to finish the canal afterwards.

Gallery

References

External links

Photosphere of a canal lock
Canal lock visible in Google Street View
Canal lock visible in Google Street View

Canals in Russia
Canals in Poland
Geography of Kaliningrad Oblast